"Lets Link" is a song by American rapper WhoHeem. It was released on August 20, 2020, and garnered popularity soon after on the video-sharing app TikTok. A remix featuring American rapper ppcocaine was released, along with another featuring American rappers Lil Mosey, and Tyga. A music video was released on October 5, 2020.

Background
On August 19, 2020, WhoHeem posted a video of him singing the song on his Instagram profile, asking his followers if he should release it next. The song was self-released the following day, and later reissued through Arista Records and Columbia Records following WhoHeem's signing to both labels. It soon went viral on the video-sharing app TikTok. By September 8, 2020, it was used in over 630,000 videos, where it inspired the #SidePieceChallenge, which shows "sidepiece" girls exposing men for cheating on their girlfriends with them.

Reception
Complimenting the "irresistibly catchy" hook and fingersnap heavy instrumental, Alphonse Pierre of Pitchfork said the song "seems inspired by San Bernardino, California rapper Whoheem's experiences hitting on girls in their Instagram DMs and it sounds as if it was written at his local mall's food court".

Charts

Certifications

References

2020 singles
2020 songs
Snap songs
Dirty rap songs